The Band of Oz is a prominent band of the United States beach music genre. Starting in the mid-1960s with high school students, the band turned professional in the early-1970s with a core group mostly from the Greenville, North Carolina Rose High School Stage Band, that featured Chuck French on trumpet, Gary Warren saxophone, Randy Hignite keyboards, Jim Heidenreich drums, Johnnie Byrd bass, Buddy Johnson vocals and Keith Houston guitar. In 1971 Billy Bazemore replaced Johnson.

In 1978, the group recorded and released their first single Shaggin. This was followed by Star of My Life in 1979, and national radio airplay. They performed 200 to 300 shows per year throughout the 1980s amidst massive personnel restructuring. In 1995 they released the hit single Shama Lama Ding Dong, the People's Choice Song of the Year at that year's Cammy Awards, and one of the most requested beach songs of all time.

In 1997, the band was inducted into the Beach Music Hall of Fame.

Personnel
Keith Houston: guitar, bass (1967–present)
Chuck French: trumpet & lead vocals (1970–present)
David Hicks: drums (1976–present)
David Franks: keyboards, harmonica, vocals (October 1983-19??, 1999–present)
Daniel Morris: saxophone & vocals (2005–present)
Tim Morris: trumpet & lead vocals (2005–present)
Dustin Ahkuoi: lead vocals (2019-present)
Chris Jennings: guitar, vocals ( 2019-present)
Jerry West: guitar, lead vocals (1996-1997,1999–2019 (took a 1½yr. leave))
Scott Fine: vocals, trombone (2005–2017)
Doug Winstead: vocals, trombone (1990-1991)
Rick Strickland: bass, vocals (1997?-1999)
"Big" John Thompson: bass, lead vocals (1980–1996)
Johnny Byrd: bass (1967-before 1976)
Shep Fields: bass
Thomas "Butch" Barnes: saxophone & vocals (1980–1985, 1991-April 2005)
Chris Keaton: saxophone, vocals (1984-1988)
Bob Lynch: saxophone (by 1976-1980)
Roland Colsen: saxophone (1975–76)
Charlie Satterwhite: saxophone (1975-76)
Gary Warren: saxophone (1970-by 1976)
Rick Brogden: keyboards (1995)
Rick Sanders: keyboards (?-1995-?)
Mickey Hardie: keyboards (19??-October 1983)
Ronnie Forbes: keyboards & vocals (1976-19??)
Randy Hignite: keyboards 1969-1976
Barry Kearney: bass (1973-74)
Jim Heidenreich: drums (1970-before 1976)
Billy Bazemore: vocals (1971–1985)
Buddy Johnson: vocals (1967–1971)
Jimmy Smith: horns (1967-by 1970)
Freddy Tripp: horns (1967-by 1970)

Discography

Albums
Beach Beat Classics (1980): L.P. compilation
Keep Keepin' It Up (1983): L.P.
Let It Roll (January 1995): C.D.
One More Step (August 1997): C.D.
Beach Beat Classics (1998): C.D. compilation
Dancing In The Street (March 1999): C.D.
The Early Years (August 2003): C.D.
Dance To The Radio
Live By Request (2013)
One's You Might Have Missed (2017)

Singles
Shaggin' (1978)
Reputation (1978)
Star of My Life (1979)
Got You Into My Life (1980)
Hot Fun In The Summertime (1981)
Lipstick Traces (1981)
Ocean Boulevard (1982)
Super Summer (1982)
Southern Belles (1983)
Good Time Music (1983)
When Love Is New (1984)
Keep Keepin' It Up (1984)
Over The Rainbow (1986)
Always Be My Girl (1986)
Too Hot To Handle (1987)
One More Step To Take (1987)
Snap Your Fingers (1989)
Rescue Me (1989)
Love Sickness (1992)
You'll Never Walk Alone (1992)
Shama Lama Ding Dong (1995)

References
Let It Roll C.D. liner notes
The Early Years C.D. backside

External links
 Official Website

Musical groups from North Carolina